Erginidae is a family of small deep sea sea snails or true limpets, marine gastropod mollusks in the subclass Patellogastropoda.

Genera
 Erginus Jeffreys, 1877
 Problacmaea Golikov & Kussakin, 1972

References

Lottioidea